Bridget of Sweden - Swedish: Birgitta - may refer to:

Bridget Haraldsdotter or Brigida (1131–c. 1208), Queen consort of Sweden 1160–1161
Bridget, Princess of Sweden (1446–1469), daughter of King Charles VIII of Sweden
Princess Birgitta of Sweden (born 1937), Princess of Sweden 
Bridget of Sweden (c. 1303–1373), Vatican saint (had no Swedish royal title)